Avi Nesher (Hebrew: אבי נשר; born 13 December 1952) is an Israeli film producer, film director, screenwriter and actor.

Biography 
Avi Nesher was born and raised in Ramat Gan, Israel. The child of a Romanian-born diplomat, and a mother who came from Russia. In 1965, he moved with his family to the United States. He graduated from high school at sixteen and studied international relations at Columbia University. In 1971 he returned to Israel. Nesher enlisted into the IDF elite special forces unit Sayeret Matkal, but after a year was reassigned as an intelligence analyst.

Film career
In 1978, Nesher directed and produced his first film, HaLahaka (Hebrew: "הלהקה", lit. The Band), which depicted an army entertainment troupe similar to the Nahal troupe (להקת הנח"ל). The film stars many of the leading actors and singers of that era, including Gidi Gov, Gali Atari, Sassi Keshet and Heli Goldenberg, most of whom served in military entertainment troupes themselves. The film was a great commercial success in Israel (600,000 viewers), received excellent reviews and gained cult film status. The movie production, accompanied by the composer Yair Rosenblum, who was musical director of the Nahal Military Group and composed the songs the band also appear in the film.

In 1979, Nesher directed his second film, Dizengoff 99, about three young friends (Anat Atzmon, Gidi Gov and Meir Suissa) living together in a flat on Dizengoff Street, the center of nightlife in Tel Aviv. The film is based on the experiences of Nesher himself, when he lived with two friends in Tel Aviv. The soundtrack of the film included songs performed by Zvika Pick, Riki Gal, Gali Atari and various Israeli bands. It was also a hit (450,000 viewers) and achieved cult film status in Israel. In 1980 Nesher directed HaPakhdanim (Hebrew: "הפחדנים", lit. The Cowards), a moderate commercial success (120,000 viewers).

In 1984, Nesher wrote, directed and produced the film Rage & Glory which tells the story of the underground Zionist group Lehi and their struggle against the British Mandate in the 1940s. The film stars Juliano Mer, Hana Azoulay-Hasfari, and Roni Finkovitz. The movie caused a political storm, was lauded by international critics and in 2001 was selected by the Lincoln Center Film Society as one of the most important films in fifty years of Israeli cinema.

In 1985, Nesher produced Shovrim, about a group of youngsters making a Rock opera parody film of the biblical story of David and Goliath.

After seeing Rage & Glory, producer Dino De Laurentis convinced Nesher to come to Hollywood. Consequently, Nesher wrote and directed the sci-fi mystery Timebomb for MGM (produced by Rafaella De Laurentiis) and starring Michael Biehn. In 1993 he directed Doppelganger for 20th Century Fox, starring Drew Barrymore. Both films won prizes at the Avoriaz Science Fiction and Fantasy Festival in France.

In 1998, Nesher wrote, produced and directed the independent feature Taxman the story of tax investigator Al Benjamin (played by Joe Pantoliano) who stumbles over a series of bloody murders and gets involved in an investigation with a rookie cop. The New York Times called the film "A delight...a charmer of a mystery" and Jeffrey Lyons of NBC called it "A cinematic gem...Not to be missed!"

In 2001, he directed for Miramax/Dimension the horror film Ritual starring Jennifer Grey and Tim Curry.

In 2004, Nesher directed, produced and wrote Turn Left at the End of the World, a film about a small town in the Negev during the 1960s and the struggle of the Moroccan and Indian Jews who live there. The film starred Neta Garty, Liraz Cherki, and Ruby Porat Shoval. The movie was nominated for 8 Israeli Academy awards and won three.

In 2005, Nesher directed the experimental political documentary Oriental about the Camp David Accords and won the "Spirit of Freedom" award at the Jerusalem Film Festival. It was described as "brilliant and original" by The Jerusalem Post, which called Nesher  "Israel's most innovative filmmaker."

In 2007, Nesher's "The Secrets" premiered at the Toronto International Film Festival. Reviewers wrote that it was "witty and wise, sensual and emotionally overpowering." "The Secrets" was shown at more than 50 international film festivals. American film critic Andrew Sarris called it "one of the best movies of the year".

In 2010 Nesher wrote, directed and produced The Matchmaker. Inspired by Amir Gutfreund's novel When Heroes Fly, the film is set in Haifa in 1968. It tells the story of an Israeli teenager who gets a summer job working for a Holocaust survivor who runs a matchmaking service.  The Matchmaker premiered at the 2010 Toronto Film Festival and later that year won the Silver Plaque award at the Chicago International Film Festival. When it opened in U.S. theaters  Los Angeles Times film critic, Kenneth Turan hailed it as "beautiful and honest."

In 2013, Nesher's film The Wonders  was praised by film critic Yair Raveh (Cinemascope) who called it the best Israeli movie of the year. It premiered at the Toronto International Film Festival and was selected as one of five exceptional films featured in the Contemporary World Speakers program. Variety film critic Alissa Simon hailed it a "smart, stylish, and sophisticated dramedy."

In 2016, Nesher wrote, directed and produced the post-war family drama "Past Life", which is set in Israel's revolutionary year of 1977 and is based on true events (inspired by Dr. Baruch Milch's autobiography "Can Heaven Be Void?")."Past Life" was an official selection at Toronto International Film Festival 16' ("Profoundly moving, suspenseful, gripping character-driven drama with hauntingly beautiful music" - Variety), and also the closing night at the Haifa International Film Festival ("An explosion of sheer emotional and cinematic virtuosity" – Cinemascope).
In its long theatrical run in Israel, "Past Life" was a resounding success, receiving excellent reviews and close to 300,000 spectators. It was nominated for 5 Ophir Awards (the Israeli Oscars) including Best Actress and Original Score. Internationally the film was bought and distributed by the Samuel Goldwyn Company and by MGM/Orion.

In 2018 Nesher released The Other Story. The film premiered at the 2018 Toronto Film Festival "The Other Story", which is based on a true story and was written by Nesher and his co-writer and known psychologist Noam Shpancer, was the most viewed Israeli film of 2018 and granted Nesher the Best Director Award from The Israeli Film Critic Association.

In 2018 Avi Nesher won a Lifetime Achievement Award from the Israeli Ministry of Culture and Sports.

In 2021, his film "Image of Victory" was nominated for 15 Israel Academy Awards and won in the best cinematography, best costume design, and best makeup categories. Avi himself was awarded the Academy of Israeli Motion Pictures Excellence Award.

On December 17, 2021, Israel's National theater awarded Nesher its prestigious "Cultural Icon" Award. 

In 2022, Nesher wrote and directed "The Monkey House". The film will be released theatrically in 2023.

Awards and recognition
In 2008, Nesher received the Extraordinary Achievement Award at the Jerusalem Film Festival. In 2009 he won the Cinematic Excellence Award at the Haifa Film Festival and was accorded a star on "The Avenue of the Stars" - an honor rarely bestowed on directors. In 2010 Nesher received the Landau Award for Excellence in the Arts. In 2017, Nesher received the Outstanding Achievement Award from the Israeli National Association of Theatres Owners, their highest award for cinematic box-office success.

 Director award, Avoriaz Fantastic Film Festival 1992
 Director award, Taromina Film Festival 2004
 Spirit of Freedom award, Jerusalem Film Festival 2005
 Best screenplay, Jackson Hole Film Festival 2007
 Lifetime achievement award, Israeli Film Festival 2007
 Extraordinary Achievement Award at the Jerusalem Film Festival 2008
 Lifetime achievement award, Washington Jewish Film Festival 2010
 Landau award for cinematic excellence 2010
 Outstanding Achievement Award for Box Office Success 2017
 Best Director Award, Israeli Film Critic Association 2018
 Lifetime Achievement Award, Israeli Ministry of Culture and Sport 2018
 Excellence Award, Academy of Israeli Motion Pictures, 2021

Filmography 
 HaLahaka ("The Band", Hebrew, 1979)
 Dizengoff 99 (Hebrew, 1979)
 She (English, 1982)
 HaPakhdanim ("The Cowards", Hebrew, 1983)
 Shovrim ("Breaking", Hebrew, 1985)
 Rage & Glory (Hebrew, 1985)
 Time Bomb (English, 1991)
 Doppelganger (English, 1993)
 Savage (English, 1996)
 The Taxman (English, 1999)
 Raw Nerve (English, 2000)
 Ritual (English, 2002)
 Sof Haolam Smola ("Turn Left at the End of the World", Hebrew, 2004)
 Oriental
 Hasodot ("The Secrets", Hebrew, 2007)
 Pa'am Haitty ("The Matchmaker", Hebrew, 2010)
 The Wonders (Hebrew, 2013)
 Past Life (Ha-Khata'im; "The Sins," Hebrew, 2016)
 The Other Story (2018)
 Image of Victory (2021)

References

External links

Hanna Brown, "Avi Nesher’s ‘Image of Victory’ is a triumph of cinema - review", the Jerusalem Post.
Hanna Brown, "Universal emotion in ‘The Other Story’", the Jerusalem Post.

Living people
Israeli film directors
Israeli film producers
Israeli people of Romanian-Jewish descent
Israeli people of Russian-Jewish descent
1952 births
Israeli emigrants to the United States
Israeli Jews